The Antillean siskin (Spinus dominicensis) is a species of finch in the family Fringillidae, and the only species of the genus Spinus found in the Caribbean.

Distribution and habitat
It is endemic to Hispaniola (in both Haiti and the Dominican Republic). Its natural habitats are subtropical or tropical moist montane forests and heavily degraded former forest.

Evolution
This seems to be the most ancient extant species of the North American Spinus evolutive radiation, being the first to diverge from the lineage which eventually gave rise to the pine, Eurasian, and black-capped siskins.

References

Antillean siskin
Endemic birds of Hispaniola
Endemic birds of the Caribbean
Birds of Hispaniola
Birds of the Dominican Republic
Birds of Haiti
Antillean siskin
Antillean siskin
Taxonomy articles created by Polbot